The Cowen Park Bridge is a reinforced concrete arch bridge in Seattle, Washington. The bridges acts as a dividing line in the Ravenna-Cowen Park contiguous area, with the smaller area west of the bridge deemed Cowen Park and the larger area east of the bridge considered Ravenna Park. The bridge, which spans from NE 62nd Street to Cowen Place NE, connects the northern Roosevelt/Ravenna neighborhood with the beginning of the University District. The Cowen Park Bridge is one of two bridges that span the Ravenna Park ravine (the other being the 20th Avenue NE Bridge built in 1913) but is the only one open to vehicular traffic.

The bridge was built in 1936 under the authority of the Works Progress Administration. The bridge engineer was Clark Eldridge. The structure is listed in the National Register of Historic Places, and it is a designated city landmark. The bridge has been praised for the  Art Deco light standards along its sides.

References

Bridges in Seattle
Bridges completed in 1936
Road bridges on the National Register of Historic Places in Washington (state)
National Register of Historic Places in Seattle
1936 establishments in Washington (state)
Concrete bridges in the United States